Chile at the 1948 Summer Olympics in London, England was the nation's eighth appearance out of eleven editions of the Summer Olympic Games. The nation was represented by a team of 54 athletes, 50 males and 4 females, that competed in 27 events in 8 sports.

Athletics

Basketball

Men's Team Competition
Preliminary Round (Group B)
 Defeated China (44-39)
 Defeated Iraq (100-18)
 Defeated Philippines (68-39)
 Lost to Belgium (36-38)
 Lost to South Korea (21-28)
Quarterfinals
 Lost to France (52-53)
Classification Matches
 5th/8th place: Defeated Czechoslovakia (38-36)
 5th/6th place: Lost to Uruguay (32-50) → Sixth place

Boxing

Cycling

Four cyclists, all men, represented Chile in 1948.

Individual road race
 Rafael Iturrate
 Mario Masanés
 Exequiel Ramírez
 Rogelio Salcedo

Team road race
 Rafael Iturrate
 Mario Masanés
 Exequiel Ramírez
 Rogelio Salcedo

Sprint
 Mario Masanés

Diving

Fencing

Three fencers, all men, represented Chile in 1948.

Men's foil
 Enrique Accorsi

Men's épée
 Enrique Accorsi
 Ignacio Goldstein

Men's sabre
 Andrés Neubauer
 Ignacio Goldstein

Modern pentathlon

Two male pentathletes represented Chile in 1948.

 Nilo Floody
 Hernán Fuentes

Shooting

Four shooters represented Chile in 1948.

25 metre pistol
 Roberto Müller
 Ignacio Cruzat
 Pedro Peña y Lillo

50 metre pistol
 Ignacio Cruzat
 Luis Ruiz Tagle
 Roberto Müller

Water polo

Men's Team Competition
Preliminary Round (Group C)
 Lost to India (4-7)
 Lost to the Netherlands (0-14) → did not advance

References

External links
Official Olympic Reports

Nations at the 1948 Summer Olympics
1948
1948 in Chilean sport